The Bangladesh Liberation War ( Muktijuddho) was a revolutionary independence war in South Asia during 1971 which established the republic of Bangladesh. The war pitted East Pakistan  against West Pakistan, and lasted over a duration of nine months. It witnessed large-scale atrocities, the exodus of 10 million refugees and the indiscriminate killing of 3 million people.

The war broke out on 26 March 1971, when the Pakistani Army launched a military operation called Operation Searchlight against Bengali civilians, students, intelligentsia and armed personnel, who were demanding that the Pakistani military junta accept the results of the 1970 first democratic elections of Pakistan, which were won by an eastern party, or to allow separation between East and West Pakistan. Bengali politicians and army officers announced the declaration of Bangladesh's independence in response to Operation Searchlight. Bengali military, paramilitary and civilians formed the Mukti Bahini ("Liberation Army"), which engaged in guerrilla warfare against Pakistani forces. The Pakistan Army, in collusion with religious extremist  militias (the Razakars, Al-Badr and Al-Shams), engaged in the systematic genocide and atrocities of Bengali civilians, particularly nationalists, intellectuals, youth and religious minorities. Bangladesh government-in-exile was set up in the city of Calcutta (now Kolkata) in the Indian state of West Bengal.

India entered the war on 3 December 1971, after Pakistan launched pre-emptive air strikes on northern India. Overwhelmed by two war fronts, Pakistani defences soon collapsed. On 16 December, the Allied Forces of Bangladesh and India defeated Pakistan in the east. The subsequent surrender resulted in the largest number of prisoners-of-war since World War II.

Foreign reaction

United Nations 
Though the United Nations condemned the human rights violations during and following Operation Searchlight, it failed to defuse the situation politically before the start of the war.

Following Sheikh Mujibur Rahman's declaration of independence in March 1971, India undertook a worldwide campaign to drum up political, democratic and humanitarian support for the people of Bangladesh for their liberation struggle. Prime Minister Indira Gandhi toured a large number of countries in a bid to create awareness of the Pakistani atrocities against Bengalis. This effort was to prove vital later during the war, in framing the world's context of the war and to justify military action by India. Also, following Pakistan's defeat, it ensured prompt recognition of the newly independent state of Bangladesh.

Following India's entry into the war, Pakistan, fearing certain defeat, made urgent appeals to the United Nations to intervene and force India to agree to a cease fire. The UN Security Council assembled on 4 December 1971 to discuss the hostilities in South Asia. After lengthy discussions on 7 December, the United States made a resolution for "immediate cease-fire and withdrawal of troops". While supported by the majority, the USSR vetoed the resolution twice and the United Kingdom and France abstained on the resolution.

On 12 December, with Pakistan facing imminent defeat, the United States requested that the Security Council be reconvened. Pakistan's Deputy Prime Minister and Foreign Minister, Zulfikar Ali Bhutto, was rushed to New York City to make the case for a resolution on the cease fire. The council continued deliberations for four days. By the time proposals were finalised, Pakistan's forces in the East had surrendered and the war had ended, making the measures merely academic. Bhutto, frustrated by the failure of the resolution and the inaction of the United Nations, ripped up his speech and left the council.

Most UN member nations were quick to recognise Bangladesh within months of its independence.

India
India was one of the first countries to recognize Bangladesh as a separate and independent state and established diplomatic relations with the country immediately after its independence in December 1971.

Bhutan
Bhutan became the first country in the world to recognize the newly independent state on 6 December 1971. Muhammad Ullah, the President of Bangladesh, visited Bhutan accompanied by his wife to attend the coronation of Jigme Singye Wangchuck, the fourth King of Bhutan in June 1974.

Myanmar
Myanmar (Burma) was one of the first countries to recognize Bangladesh.

USA and USSR 

The United States supported Pakistan both politically and materially. US President Richard Nixon denied getting involved in the situation, saying that it was an internal matter of Pakistan, but when Pakistan's defeat seemed certain, Nixon sent the aircraft carrier USS Enterprise to the Bay of Bengal, a move deemed by the Indians as a nuclear threat. Enterprise arrived on station on 11 December 1971. Declassified Indian Air Force documents reveal the Indians were planning a kamikaze like strike attack using B1 Canbbera Bombers, however, on 6 and 13 December, the Soviet Navy dispatched two groups of ships, armed with nuclear missiles, from Vladivostok; they trailed US Task Force 74 in the Indian Ocean from 18 December until 7 January 1972.

Nixon and Henry Kissinger feared Soviet expansion into South and Southeast Asia. Pakistan was a close ally of the People's Republic of China, with whom Nixon had been negotiating a rapprochement and which he intended to visit in February 1972. Nixon feared that an Indian invasion of West Pakistan would mean total Soviet domination of the region, and that it would seriously undermine the global position of the United States and the regional position of America's new tacit ally, China. To demonstrate to China the bona fides of the United States as an ally, and in direct violation of the US Congress-imposed sanctions on Pakistan, Nixon sent military supplies to Pakistan and routed them through Jordan and Iran, while also encouraging China to increase its arms supplies to Pakistan. The Nixon administration also ignored reports it received of the genocidal activities of the Pakistani Army in East Pakistan, most notably the Blood telegram.

The Soviet Union supported Bangladesh and Indian armies, as well as the Mukti Bahini during the war, recognising that the independence of Bangladesh would weaken the position of its rivals – the United States and China. It gave assurances to India that if a confrontation with the United States or China developed, the USSR would take countermeasures. This was enshrined in the Indo-Soviet friendship treaty signed in August 1971. The Soviets also sent a nuclear submarine to ward off the threat posed by USS Enterprise in the Indian Ocean.

At the end of the war, the Warsaw Pact countries were among the first to recognise Bangladesh. The Soviet Union accorded recognition to Bangladesh on 25 January 1972. The United States delayed recognition for some months, before according it on 8 April 1972.

Pakistan

Pakistan, which Bangladesh had gained independence from in the 1971 war, didn't recognise the country until it was pressured by other Muslim-majority nations. Bangladesh's founder Sheikh Mujibur Rahman was kept imprisoned by Pakistani authorities even after the end of war, before being released in January 1972. The recognition issue had been stuck over Pakistan wanting to avoid any of its nationals being tried for war crimes. Muslim-majority countries including Jordan, Egypt, Indonesia and Saudi Arabia however pressured it because they wanted to fix this discord that had emerged in the Islamic world. Foreign ministers of seven nations went to Bangladesh to convince it to drop its planned trials. Pakistan's Prime Minister Zulfikar Ali Bhutto on 22 February 1974, officially announced recognition of the country during a speech before a Lahore television studio filled to the capacity, and got emotional while speaking. He added that while he didn't like it, Bangladesh's independence was a reality. In return, Bangladesh agreed to attend the Organisation of Islamic Conference summit to be held that year in Lahore.

Bhutto landed in Bangladesh for a visit on 27 June 1974, the first visit by a Pakistani leader since the 1971 war. The two discussed division of assets between the two nations and Pakistan accepting more non-Bengalis from the country. Relations between the two countries remained lukewarm however because of the dispute on assets and the issues of the Bihari Muslims. After the 15 August 1975 Bangladesh coup d'état, Pakistan immediately recognized the new government and relations improved. Ambassadorial relations were established in January 1976 with Bangladeshi ambassador Zahiruddin and Pakistani ambassador Mohammad Khurshid assuming their respective posts.

China 
As a long-standing ally of Pakistan, the People's Republic of China reacted with alarm to the evolving situation in East Pakistan and the prospect of India invading West Pakistan and Pakistani-administered Kashmir. Believing that just such an Indian attack was imminent, Nixon encouraged China to mobilise its armed forces along its border with India to discourage it. The Chinese did not, however, respond to this encouragement, because unlike the 1962 Sino-Indian War when India was caught entirely unaware, this time the Indian Army was prepared and had deployed eight mountain divisions to the Sino-Indian border to guard against such an eventuality. China instead threw its weight behind demands for an immediate ceasefire.

When Bangladesh applied for membership to the United Nations in 1972, China vetoed their application because two United Nations resolutions regarding the repatriation of Pakistani prisoners of war and civilians had not yet been implemented. China was also among the last countries to recognise independent Bangladesh, refusing to do so until 31 August 1975.

List of countries in order of their recognition of Bangladesh

The list of the countries that recognized Bangladesh are listed according to their order in The Congressional Record (9 February 1972) of Senate.

Notes

See also
 Foreign relations of Bangladesh
 History of Bangladesh

References 

Foreign relations of Bangladesh
Diplomatic recognition
Aftermath of the Bangladesh Liberation War